Eugène Balleyguier (1818-1898) was a French writer, art critic and journalist. He was born in Loudun and died in Paris.

Selected works 
Du présent et de l'avenir de la Révolution (1848)
La Vendée - Le pays, les mœurs, la guerre (1849) (le Sudoc donne 1873)
Le Salon de 1852 (1852), deux tirages
Le général Charles Abbatucci (1854)
L'Angleterre et l'Allemagne en France : de l'influence des idées anglaises et germaniques sur l'esprit français (1854)
Les Derniers orateurs (1855)
Le salon de 1855 : exposition universelle des beaux-arts (1855)
Études sur les œuvres de Napoléon III (1857)
Le Salon de 1857 (1857)
Étude sur les œuvres de Napoléon III (1857)
Les Victoires de l'Empire - Campagnes d'Italie, d'Égypte, d'Autriche, de Prusse, de Russie, de France et de Crimée (1859; four editions)
La Bretagne ; paysage et récits (1861)
Les Pères de l'Église - Choix de lectures morales (1861)
Les Trois races, ou les Allemands, les Anglais et les Français (1861-1863)
Les Deux Paganismes (1865)
Les Nouveaux Jacobins (1869)
Journal d'un Parisien pendant la révolution de septembre et la Commune (1872)
Les Précurseurs de la Révolution (1875)
Saint-Just (1876)
Le Mal et le Bien - Tableau de l'histoire universelle du monde païen et du monde chrétien, 5 vol. (1876-1888)
Les ignorances de la science moderne (1878)
Son Altesse le Prince impérial (1879)
 Les Découvertes de la science sans Dieu (1884)
Journal de Fidus sous la République opportuniste, de la mort du prince impérial jusqu'à la mort de Gambetta 5 vol. (1885-1890)
L'Italie moderne (1886)
Souvenirs d'un impérialiste : Journal de dix ans (1886; two volumes)
Notes sur ma vie (1998)

References

Bibliography
Eugène Loudun, Notes sur ma vie (1818-1867), Lettres choisies (1838-1898), édition présentée, établie et annotée par Gérard Jubert, PSR éditions, La Roche-Rigaud, 1998.

1818 births
1898 deaths
People from Loudun
19th-century French journalists
19th-century French essayists
French art critics
French political writers